Rohit John Chettri, also known as RJC, is a singer, musician, music producer, lyricist and guitarist from Kathmandu.

Early life 
Chettri's father was a music lover, and they used to play musical instruments like guitar and harmonium together when his father would come back home in the evening after work.

When he was seven years old, he took part in an inter-school competition where he had to choose to either dance, sketch or sing, Chettri sang a song of Karna Das called "Jindagi ko k bharosa". According to Chettri, this is when he realized he would become a singer-songwriter  In class 9, he formed a band with his friends called "Derailed" where he was the vocalist and drummer. After class 10, or SLC, Chettri started performing at various pubs, bars and private events.

In 2011, he started working at Kathmandu Jazz Conservatory.

Breakthrough 
Chettri's song ‘Bistarai’ received more than a million views.

Chettri played at pubs and bars to raise money for the production of his first album, and two years after his YouTube breakthrough, Chettri released his first solo album, "Bistarai Bistarai" in September 2015.

1974 AD 

Chettri became a part of the Nepalese rock band 1974 AD in 2015 when Adrian Pradhan and Phiroj Shyagden left the band for personal reasons. Chettri was chosen to fill their spot.

Together, the "new" 1974 AD released the album "Hazaar Sapana" in 2016.

Solo albums 
First Album "Bistarai Bistarai"

Second Album "Jhari Pachi ko Indreni" 

Third Album "Bidaai"

References

External links 
 Rohit John Chettri Official website

Nepalese singer-songwriters
Nepalese musicians
Living people
Nepali-language singers
1991 births